Hasan Aliyev may refer to:

Hasan Aliyev (academician) (1907–1993), Azerbaijani academician and politician
Hasan Aliyev (wrestler) (born 1989), Azerbaijani Greco-Roman wrestler